Robert Creel Davis (November 6, 1949 – September 8, 1991), known professionally as Brad Davis, was an American actor and is a Golden Globe award winner. He is known for starring in the 1978 film Midnight Express, Chariots of Fire and the 1982 film Querelle.

Early life
He was born in Tallahassee, Florida, to Eugene Davis, a dentist whose career declined due to alcoholism, and his wife, Anne (née Creel) Davis. His brother Gene is also an actor. According to an interview with his widow, Susan Bluestein Davis, discussing her book about his life, After Midnight: The Life and Death of Brad Davis, in The New York Times published in 1997, she claimed that Davis told her that he suffered physical abuse from his father and sexual abuse from his mother. As an adult, Brad Davis was an alcoholic and an intravenous drug user, then became sober in 1981. Davis was known as Bobby during his youth, but took Brad as his stage name in 1973. Davis attended and graduated from Titusville High School.

Career
At 16, after winning a music-talent contest, Davis worked at Theater Atlanta. He later moved to New York City and attended the American Academy of Dramatic Arts, and the American Place Theater where he studied acting. After a role on the soap opera How to Survive a Marriage, he performed in Off-Broadway plays.

In 1976, he was cast in the television mini-series Roots, then as Sally Field's love interest in the television film Sybil. In 1977 he was cast as John Rambo in First Blood when John Frankenheimer was scheduled to direct the film before it was cancelled due to Orion Pictures' acquisition of Filmways. In 1981, he played American track star Jackson Scholz in the Academy Award-winning film Chariots of Fire. He played the lead role in The Normal Heart (1985), Larry Kramer's play about AIDS. His most successful film role was as the main character Billy Hayes in Midnight Express (1978), for which he won the Golden Globe Award for New Star of the Year – Actor and the Golden Globe Award for Best Motion Picture Acting Debut – Actor. He was nominated for a similar award at that year's BAFTA Awards, in addition to receiving Best Actor nominations at both ceremonies (Richard Dreyfuss won for The Goodbye Girl).

Personal life
Davis married casting director Susan Bluestein in 1976. They had one child, Alex Blue Davis (born 1983), a musician and actor. He was bisexual. 

He is the brother of actor Eugene M. Davis.

Death
Diagnosed with HIV in 1985, Davis kept his condition private until shortly before his death at age 41 on September 8, 1991, in Los Angeles. It was revealed in a book proposal that Davis had written before his death that he had to keep his HIV-positive status a secret to be able to continue to work and support his family. He is interred at Forest Lawn Memorial Park in the Hollywood Hills. In 1997 his wife Susan revealed that he committed assisted suicide by a drug overdose.

Filmography

Film

Television

Awards and nominations

References

External links

 
 
 
 

1949 births
1991 deaths
1991 suicides
20th-century American male actors
Male actors from Tallahassee, Florida
People with HIV/AIDS
American bisexual actors
American male film actors
American male stage actors
American male television actors
Bisexual male actors
Burials at Forest Lawn Memorial Park (Hollywood Hills)
American people of Welsh descent
LGBT people from Florida
New Star of the Year (Actor) Golden Globe winners
Titusville High School alumni
Deaths by euthanasia
Drug-related suicides in California